The Wintergreen Country Store is a historic building built originally as a country store located near Nellysford, Nelson County, Virginia. It is a one- and two-story, shed roofed, frame vernacular building with weatherboard siding on a masonry and concrete foundation. The store was built in four phases: the original store was a one-story, one-room building with a  porch, built between 1908 and 1909; the second was living space added in the late 1920s; the third phase added a two-story section with a two-story porch; and the fourth phase was added by Wintergreen Ski Resort as a welcoming center when it first opened in 1975.  After closing as an office and gift shop for the Wintergreen resort, the building was used as a meeting place for Peace in the Valley, an Episcopal Church mission. Thereafter it served as home for the Spruce Creek Gallery with its wonderful collection of crafts by local artists for 12 years.  It now serves as the Rockfish Valley Foundation Natural History Center and is affiliated with the Virginia Museum of Natural History.

It was listed on the National Register of Historic Places in 2005.

References

Commercial buildings on the National Register of Historic Places in Virginia
Buildings and structures in Nelson County, Virginia
Commercial buildings completed in 1909
National Register of Historic Places in Nelson County, Virginia